Loveland, Washington was a community located northeast of the current city of Roy, Washington.

References

External links
Loveland -Washington Hometown Locator

Populated places in Pierce County, Washington